Motipur railway station is a railway station on Muzaffarpur–Gorakhpur main line under the Samastipur railway division of East Central Railway zone. This is situated beside National Highway 28 at Ratanpura, Motipur in Muzaffarpur district of the Indian state of Bihar.

References

Railway stations in Muzaffarpur district
Samastipur railway division